Yo Soy means "I am" in Spanish and may refer to:

 Yo Soy 132,  a Mexican protest movement for the democratization of the country and its media. 
 Yo Soy (Yolandita Monge album), 1973
 Yo Soy (Pee Wee album), 2009
 Yo Soy (Mariana Ochoa album), 2004
 Yo Soy, album by Américo
 Revés/Yo Soy, 1997 album by Café Tacuba
 Yo Soy, Peruvian reality show, 2012-present.

See also
Soy Yo (disambiguation)